Reading 2124 is a preserved American class "T-1" 4-8-4 "Northern" type steam locomotive that was built by the Reading Company in January 1947 using parts from "I-10sa" class 2-8-0 "Consolidation" type locomotive number 2024, which was originally built by the Baldwin Locomotive Works in 1924.

History
The locomotive that became 2124 was originally built as Reading Company class "I-10sa" 2-8-0 "Consolidation" type locomotive number 2024 by the Baldwin Locomotive Works in 1924. Starting in 1945, Reading began building a new class of 4-8-4 "Northern" type locomotives using the boilers and fireboxes from the I-10sas, designating these new locomotives as the T-1 class. 2024 underwent this rebuild in late 1946 and emerged in January 1947 as the number 2124.

For the majority of its working life, the engine was used on freight trains, primarily coal trains throughout various parts of the Reading's network before being retired from active service in 1956.

The locomotive was brought back into service in May 1959 to pull a series of railfan excursions known as the "Iron Horse Rambles" alongside No. 2100. On October 22, 1961, the locomotive's flue time ran out, and the Reading replaced No. 2124 with No. 2102 in the rambles. It was subsequently sold to locomotive collector and the owner of Blount Seafood, F. Nelson Blount, for his Steamtown, U.S.A. museum in North Walpole, New Hampshire, later relocated across the Connecticut River to Bellows Falls, Vermont.

The engine was displayed in Vermont until Steamtown moved to Scranton, Pennsylvania, during the winter of 1983–84. In 1986, Steamtown was taken over by the National Park Service and became Steamtown National Historic Site. The locomotive was placed on display near the entrance to the park and was one of the first things visitors would see upon entering the park.

As of 2023, the engine still remains on static display at the entrance to Steamtown.
There are no current plans to restore 2124 back to operating condition.

In popular culture
In December 1959, the locomotive was filmed at the Central Railroad of New Jersey Terminal for the 1960 Mark Robson film, From the Terrace, starring Joanne Woodward and Paul Newman.

References

Individual locomotives of the United States
4-8-4 locomotives
2124
Baldwin locomotives
Philadelphia and Reading Railroad locomotives
Freight locomotives
Standard gauge locomotives of the United States
Preserved steam locomotives of Pennsylvania
Railway locomotives introduced in 1923